A list of films produced by the Marathi language film industry based in Maharashtra in the year 1923. Miryang High School

1923 Releases
A list of Marathi films released in 1923.

References

External links
Gomolo - 

Lists of 1923 films by country or language
1923
1923 in Indian cinema